Danny Washbrook (born 18 September 1985) is an English rugby league footballer who plays as a  and  forward for the York City Knights in the Betfred Championship. 

He has played for Hull F.C. in two separate spells and the Wakefield Trinity Wildcats in the Super League, and on loan from Hull at Doncaster in Betfred League 1. He played as a  earlier in his career.

Background
Washbrook was born in Kingston upon Hull, Humberside, England.

Career
Hull reached the 2006 Super League Grand final to be contested against St. Helens, and Washbrook played at loose forward in his side's 4–26 loss.

He signed a three-year deal at Super League club Wakefield Trinity, following Hull Coach Richard Agar.

On 4 May 2014, Washbrook made his 200th career appearance. His current club, Wakefield Trinity, beat his former club, Hull, on his milestone.

On 13 August 2015 Hull re-signed Washbrook on a two-year deal, with coach Lee Radford saying he returns a better player than the last time he was at the club. Washbrook can play loose forward or cover Danny Houghton at hooker and cover in the centres despite not being a centre by trade.

He played in the 2016 Challenge Cup Final victory over the Warrington Wolves at Wembley Stadium.

He played in the 2017 Challenge Cup Final victory over the Wigan Warriors at Wembley Stadium.

References

External links

Hull FC profile
 RLeague.com
 Hull Profile
SL profile

1985 births
Living people
Doncaster R.L.F.C. players
English rugby league players
Hull F.C. players
Rugby league locks
Rugby league players from Kingston upon Hull
Wakefield Trinity players
York City Knights players